Farrukh Dustov was the defending champion, but lost to Jürgen Zopp in the second round .

Marco Chiudinelli won the title, defeating Jan Hernych in the final 6–3, 7–6(11–9) .

Seeds

Draw

Finals

Top half

Bottom half

References
 Main Draw
 Qualifying Draw

Wroclaw Open - Singles